

The Maeda Ku-1, long designation Maeda Army Type 2 Small Glider, was a small twin boom Japanese military glider. It was primarily used for training, and was superseded by the Kokusai Ku-7, which was effectively a scaled-up version of the design. Approximately 100 were produced.

Design and development
Professor Hirosho Sato of the Imperial university engineering college at Kyushu designed an assault glider for the Imperial Japanese Army (IJA) in response to news of airborne assaults in Europe. The prototype was manufactured by Maeda Aircraft Corporation and designated Ku-1 (Ku - from Kakku - to glide). Once accepted for production the glider was given the long designation Maeda Army Type 2 Small Glider.

The Ku-1 was built almost entirely from wood / plywood and was a high-wing glider with twin boom tail sporting a fin and rudder at the end of each boom, with a tail-plane and elevator between the boom ends. The fuselage pod was given a streamlined shape, but with flat sides and a cockpit for two forward of the wing. The undercarriage consisted of two spatted main-wheels on short axles either side of the fuselage, with skids at nose and tail ends of the fuselage pod. The booms, attached to the wing centre-section, were wire-braced horizontally and the fins were braced by short struts on the inboard faces. Passengers and cargo were housed in the cabin below the wing, aft of the cockpit. The three piece wing consisted of the centre-section, attached to the fuselage pod and two outer panels which were tapered and carried the ailerons for roll control.

Variants
Ku-1-IBaseline production glider;100 built.
Ku-1-IITransparent nose, single tail boom and longer fuselage, prototype only.
Ku-1-IIIAn aerofoil section fuselage with tapered wings, prototype only.

Specifications (Ku-1)

See also
List of aircraft of World War II
List of World War II military gliders

References

Ku-01, Maeda
1940s military gliders
World War II Japanese transport aircraft
Ku-1
Twin-boom aircraft